Nils Are Øritsland (5 August 1939 – 24 November 2006) was a Norwegian polar researcher in animal physiology and ecology. Øritsland received his PhD in 1976 from the University of Oslo. He was director of the Norwegian Polar Institute from 1991 to 1993. In 1980, Øritsland conducted a controversial study into the effects of oil spills on polar bears that resulted in the deaths of polar bears after they ingested crude oil.

Selected works 
Lavigne, D. M. and Øritsland, N. A. (1974) Ultraviolet photography: a new application for remote sensing of mammals, Can J. Zool. 52, 939–943
Lavigne, D. M. and Øritsland, N. A. (1974) Black polar bears, Nature 251, 218–219
Øritsland, N. A. and Ronald, K. (1978) Solar heating of mammals: Observations of hair transmittance, Int. J. Biometeor. 22, 197–201
Øritsland, N. A. (1986) Svalbardreinen og dens livsgrunnlag, Universitetsforlaget, 
Øritsland, N. A. (1990) Starvation survival and body composition in mammals with particular reference to Homo sapiens. Bulletin of Mathematical Biology 52, 643–655

References 

1939 births
2006 deaths
20th-century Norwegian scientists
21st-century Norwegian scientists